Bochröder is a German surname. Notable people with the surname include:

 Kristin Bochröder (born 1941), German judge and marathon runner
 Ralf Bochröder (born 1940), German marathon runner

German-language surnames